Fatemeh Moosavi (born  August 23, 1983) is an Iranian film director, photographer, script writer and film producer. Her two most successful documentaries are Swallow produced in 2013 and My Heritage Singing in 2015, which both were chosen film of Iran international documentary film festival.

Early life 
Fatemeh Moosavi studied Architecture at university and graduated at the age of 23. Soon she realized her interest in art. She wrote two poetry books and was attracted to paintings. Later she started to create collections of short movies on Iranian national TV.

Filmography

Movies

Awards and nominations

References 

1983 births
Living people
Iranian women film directors
Iranian film directors
Iranian film producers
Iranian screenwriters
People from Tehran
Iranian cinematographers